The Thomond deeds are Irish deeds relating to lands and property in Thomond, County Clare, preserved in the Library of Trinity College, Dublin. The collection, written in Irish and mainly consisting of "deeds and instruments related to property", has undated documents from the 12th through the 14th centuries; for the most part, however, the documents are dated, between 1419 and 1619. It provides an important background for later legal writing in Ireland.

Hardiman, 1826, says of these deeds

Notes

Reference bibliography

Further reading 
 

Real property law